Samim Kocagöz (born 13 February 1916, Söke - 5 September 1993, İzmir), was a Turkish novelist.

Biography 
He graduated from Istanbul University, Faculty of Literature, Department of Turkish Language and Literature in 1942. Between 1942-1945 he studied art history at the University of Lausanne. After returning to Turkey, he taught literature at Izmir Trade School and art history at the State Conservatory for a while. He was engaged in farming in Söke.

Bibliography

Novel
 İkinci Dünya
 Bir Şehrin İki Kapısı
 Yılan Hikayesi
 Onbinlerin Dönüşü
 Kalpaklılar
 Doludizgin
 Bir Karış Toprak
 Bir Çift Öküz
 İzmir'in İçinde
 Tartışma
 Mor Ötesi
 Eski Toprak

Story
 "Telli Kavak"
 "Sam Amca"
 "Sığınak"
 "Cihan Şoförü"
 "Ahmet'in Kuzuları"
 "Yolun Üstündeki Kaya"
 "Yağmurdaki Kız"
 "Alandaki Delikanlı"
 "Gecenin Soluğu"
 "Koca Öküzün Ölümü"

References 

1916 births
1993 deaths
Turkish-language writers
Turkish poets